Arnold Paul Krammer was an American historian who specialized in German and United States history and a professor at Texas A&M University in College Station, Texas. He was twice a Fulbright scholar: in 1992–1993, he studied at the University of Tübingen and, in 2002–2003, he studied at the University of Jena.

He was born in Chicago, Illinois to David and Eva (Vas) Krammer. He studied at the University of Wisconsin-Madison where he earned his BS, MS, and, in 1970, PhD degrees. He came to Texas A&M in 1974 and retired in 2015, having taught American and German history to thousands of Aggies. His specialties included the First and Second World Wars, 20th Century Germany, and the Holocaust. He led numerous study abroad groups of Aggies to Germany, Italy, Normandy, and Poland. He was twice honored with the Texas A&M University Distinguished Faculty Award for Teaching.

Principal works
 
 
 
 .
 
 .

Awards 

 1975: National Jewish Book Award in the Israel category for The Forgotten Friendship: Israel and the Soviet Bloc, 1947-1953

References

1941 births
2018 deaths
20th-century American historians
20th-century American male writers
21st-century American historians
21st-century American male writers
American male non-fiction writers
Historians from Illinois
Historians of Europe
Historians of Germany
Historians of the United States
Rockford University faculty
Texas A&M University faculty
University of Vienna alumni
University of Wisconsin–Madison College of Engineering alumni
Writers from Chicago